Edward William Tucker (born May 7, 1949 in Fort William, Ontario), is a Canadian retired professional ice hockey  goaltender who briefly played for the California Golden Seals of the National Hockey League in the 1973–74 season.

Career statistics

Regular season and playoffs

External links

1949 births
Living people
California Golden Seals players
Canadian ice hockey goaltenders
Clinton Comets players
Columbus Owls players
Dayton Gems players
Ice hockey people from Ontario
Sportspeople from Thunder Bay
Montreal Junior Canadiens players
Muskegon Mohawks players
Port Huron Flags (IHL) players
Saginaw Gears players
Salt Lake Golden Eagles (WHL) players
Toledo Goaldiggers players
Canadian expatriate ice hockey players in the United States